José Ruiz Sánchez (born 19 October 1980 in Villafranca de Córdoba) is a former Spanish cyclist.

References

1983 births
Living people
Spanish male cyclists
Sportspeople from the Province of Córdoba (Spain)
Cyclists from Andalusia